Wu Yingjie (born December 1956) is a Chinese politician based in Tibet who formerly served as Communist Party Secretary of the Tibet Autonomous Region, the top official in Tibet. Originally from Shandong province, Wu grew up in Tibet and worked for his entire career in the region. He became Deputy Party Secretary of Tibet in 2011 and served in the post for nearly five years before being elevated to party chief.

Biography
Wu was born in Changyi County, Shandong province. His father received a job assignment in the Tibetan Plateau when he was just one year old, so he moved to the region with his family. He arrived in Nyingchi in October 1974 as a rusticated youth during the Cultural Revolution. Wu is a graduate of the Tibet Minzu University and took part in leadership education at the Central Party School of the Chinese Communist Party. In 1977 he began working for a power generation station in the western suburbs of Lhasa. In August 1983 he joined the Tibet Autonomous Region's department of education. He would work in education for the next two decades. In 1987 he began overseeing elementary and secondary education as a regional bureaucrat. In 1990, he was put in charge of accepting donations of educational resources from other parts of the country. In 1994 he joined the Autonomous Region Education Commission, rising to deputy secretary in May 1998. In March 2000 he was named deputy head of the education department, then promoted to head in 2000.

In January 2003, Wu was named Vice Chairman of the Tibet Autonomous Region; in June 2005 he took on the regional propaganda portfolio, and joined the regional party standing committee next month. In November 2006 he became Executive Vice Chairman of the Tibet Autonomous Region.

In November 2011 he was named deputy regional party chief. In April 2013 he was named executive deputy party chief. In August 2016, he became the Communist Party Secretary of the Tibet Autonomous Region. Wu leaped directly from the deputy party chief position into the office of the party secretary, breaking a tradition that TAR party chiefs would be appointed from other regions in China.

On 23 October 2021, he was appointed vice chairperson of the National People's Congress Education, Science, Culture and Public Health Committee.

U.S. sanctions 

In December 2022, the United States Department of the Treasury sanctioned Wu under the Global Magnitsky Act for human rights abuses in Tibet.

References

1956 births
Living people
Politicians from Weifang
Political office-holders in Tibet
Members of the 19th Central Committee of the Chinese Communist Party
Delegates to the 12th National People's Congress
Sent-down youths
Chinese individuals subject to U.S. Department of the Treasury sanctions